Dogs are an important motif in Chinese mythology. These motifs include a particular dog which accompanies a hero, the dog as one of the twelve totem creatures for which years are named, a dog giving first provision of grain which allowed current agriculture, and claims of having a magical dog as an original ancestor in the case of certain ethnic groups.

Myth versus history
Chinese mythology includes myths in Chinese and other languages, as transmitted by Han Chinese as well as other ethnic groups (of which fifty-six are officially recognized by the current administration of China). (Yang 2005:4)

In the study of historical Chinese culture, many of the stories that have been told regarding characters and events which have been written or told of the distant past have a double tradition: one which tradition which presents a more historicized and one which presents a more mythological version.(Yang 2005: 12–13) This is also true of some accounts related to mythological dogs in China.

Historical accounts and anecdotes about dogs from ancient China and onwards exist in extant literary works, for example in the Shiji, by Sima Qian. Archaeological study provides substantial backing and supplemental knowledge in this regard.

Names in cross-cultural comparison

Wolfram Eberhard points out that compared to other cultures it is "striking " that Chinese literature rarely has given names for dogs. (Eberhard 2003: 82) This means that in the context of Chinese mythology, often a dog will play an important role, but that it will not be given a proper name, but rather being referred to as "dog". 

As Chinese grammar does not require the use of definite or indefinite articles or marking for singular or plural number, there may be ambiguity regarding whether the reference to dog means "Dog" (proper name), "dogs", "a dog", "the dog",  "some dogs", or "the dogs".

Zodiacal dog

For thousands of years, a twelve-year cycle named after various real or mythological animals has been used in Southeast Asia. This twelve-year cycle, sometimes referred to as the "Chinese zodiac," associates each year in turn with a certain creature, in a fixed order of twelve animals, after which it returns to the first in the order, the Rat. The eleventh in the cycle is the Dog. 

One account is that the order of the beings-of-the-year is due to their order in a racing contest involving swimming across a river, in the  Great Race. The reason for the Dog finishing the race second from last despite generally being a talented swimmer is explained as being due to its playful nature: the Dog played and frolicked along the way, thus delaying completing the course and reaching the finishing line. 

The personalities of people born in Dog years are popularly supposed to share certain attributes associated with Dogs, such as loyalty or exuberance; however, this would be modified according to other considerations of Chinese astrology, such as the influences of the month, day and hour of birth, according to the traditional system of Earthly Branches, in which the zodiacal animals are also associated with the months and times of the day (and night), in twelve two-hour increments. 

The Hour of the Dog is 7 to 9 p.m. and the Dog is associated with the ninth lunar month.

Panhu

There are various myths and legends in which various ethnic groups claimed or were claimed to have had a divine dog as a forebear, one of these is the story of Panhu. The legendary Chinese sovereign Di Ku has been said to have a dog named Panhu. Panhu helped him win a war by killing the enemy general and bringing him his head and ended up with marriage to the emperor's daughter as a reward. 

The dog carried his bride to the mountainous region of the south, where they produced numerous progeny. Because of their self-identification as descendants from these original ancestors, Panhu has been worshiped by the Yao people and the She people, often as King Pan, and the eating of dog meat tabooed (Yang et al 2005, 52–53). This ancestral myth is also has been found among the Miao people and Li people (Yang et al 2005, 100 and 180). 

An early documentary source for the Pan-hu origin myth is by the Jin dynasty (266–420) author Gan Bao, who records this origin myth for a southern (that is, south of the Yangzi River) ethnic group which he refers to as "Man" (蠻) (Mair October, 1998: 3-5 and note 3, 31–32).

Variations
There are various variations of the Panhu mythology. According to one version, the Emperor had promised his daughter in marriage as a reward to the one who brought back the enemy general's head, but due to the perceived difficulties of a dog marriage with a human bride (especially an imperial princess), the dog proposed to magically turn into a human being, by means of a process in which he would be sequestered beneath a bell for 280 days. 

However, the curious emperor, unable to restrain himself, lifted up the rim of the bell on the 279th day: the spell was thus broken before the transformation was completed, and, although the rest of the body had been transformed to human, the head had not (Christie 1968: 121–122).

Culturally-relative interpretations
Victor Mair (October, 1998) brings up the point that the idea of being descended from dogs may have a pejorative connotation or connotations. Whether this would be the case or not would be relative to assumed cultural evaluations of dogs versus humans.

Erlang's dog

One of the stock heroic supernatural beings with mighty martial prowess in Chinese culture is Erlang, a character in Journey to the West. Erlang has been said to have a dog. In the epic novel, Journey to the West Erlang's dog helps him in his fight against the evolved-monkey hero, Sun Wukong, critically biting him on the leg. 

Later on in the story (Chapter 63), Sun Wukong with Erlang (now both on the same side) and their companions-in-fight battle against a Nine-headed Insect monster, when, again, Erlang's small hound comes to the rescue and defeats by biting off the monster's retractable head, which popped in and out of its torso: the monster then flees, dripping blood, off into the unknown. 

The author of the Journey to the West comments that this is the origin of the "nine-headed blood-dripping bird", and that this trait was passed on to its descendant. Anthony C. Yu, editor and translator of Journey to the West  associates this bird with the ts'ang kêng of Chinese mythology (1980: Volume III, 441, note 5 on chapter 63).

Tiangou

The Tiangou ("Heavenly Dog") has been said to resemble a black dog or meteor, which is thought to eat the sun or moon during an eclipse, unless frightened away.

Obtaining grain

According to the myths of various ethnic groups, a dog provided humans with the first grain seeds enabling the seasonal cycle of planting, harvesting, and replanting staple agricultural products by saving some of the seed grains to replant, thus explaining the origin of domesticated cereal crops. This myth is common to the Buyi, Gelao, Hani, Miao, Shui, Tibetan, Tujia, and Zhuang peoples. (Yang 2005: 53) 

A version of this myth collected from ethnic Tibetan people in Sichuan tells that in ancient times grain was tall and bountiful, but that rather than being duly grateful for the plenty that people even used it for personal hygiene after defecation, which so angered the God of Heaven that he came down to earth to repossess it all. 

However, a dog grasped his pant leg, piteously crying, and so moving God of Heaven to leave a few seeds from each type of grain with the dog, thus providing the seed stock of today's crops. Thus it is said that because humans owe their possession of grain seed stocks to a dog, people should share some of their food with dogs.(Yang 2005: 53–54) 

Another myth, of the Miao people, recounts the time of the distantly remote era when dogs had nine tails, until a dog went to steal grains from heaven, and lost eight of its tails to the weapons of the heavenly guards while making its escape, but bringing back grain seeds stuck onto its surviving tail. According to this, when Miao people hold their harvest celebration festival, the dogs are the first to be fed.(Yang 2005: 54) The Zhuang and Gelao peoples have a similar myth explaining why it is that the ripe heads of grain stalks are curly, bushy, and bent – just so as is the tail of a dog.(Yang 2005: 54)

Ritual

Paper dogs
In northern China, dog images made by cutting paper were thrown in the water as part of the ritual of the Double Fifth (Duanwu Festival) holiday, celebrated on the fifth day of the fifth lunar month, as an apotropaic magic act meant to drive away evil spirits. Paper dogs were also provided for protecting the dead (Eberhard, 2003: 80).

"Foo Dogs"

Numerous statuary of Chinese guardian lions exist, which are often called "Fu Dogs" "Foo Dogs", "Fu Lions", "Fo Lions", and "Lion Dogs". Modern lions are not native in the area of China, except perhaps the extreme west; however, their existence was well known, and associated symbolism and ideas about lions were familiar; however, in China, artistic representations of lions tended to be dog-like. Indeed, "[t]he 'lion' which we see depicted in Chinese paintings and in sculpture bears little resemblance to the real animal, which, however, plays a big part in Chinese folklore."(Eberhard, 2003: 164) The reasons for referencing "guardian lions" as "dogs" in Western cultures may be obscure, however the phenomenon is well known.

Real and legendary dogs

Despite any fantastic myths from China about dogs, real dogs have been familiar throughout China since prehistorical times (unlike certain exotic animals, such as lions or other creatures, whose real attributes may often only have been known indirectly). 

Dogs also feature in various historical and legendary accounts or stories, found in the extensive literary records of China, although in some cases the lines between myth and ancient history are uncertain. However, in many myths, legends, or other accounts of dogs in Chinese literature, the dog or dogs are presented in ways that in have no appearance of the fanciful or fantastic (as opposed to the way other creatures may typically be handled in mythology, such as in the case of turtles, snakes, dragons, or often even horses).

The Savior with a Tail (Chinese: 的尾救主/Dewěijiùzhǔ), is a novel originating from the Northern Song Dynasty. In the novel, a man named Hualong loved to shoot and hunt. His dog, nicknamed 'Tail' (的尾/Dewěi) follows him every time he goes hunting. One day, Hualong went to the riverside and a python wound itself around him, suffocating him. 'Tail' bit the snake to death, but his master lay stiffly on the ground unconsciously. 'Tail' barked restlessly around Hualong for a while, before running back home. Hualong's family was surprised by the dog's behavior, so they followed the dog to the river. Seeing Hualong unconscious on the ground, his family rushed him back home, where he woke up only two days later. 'Tail' did not eat for two days until his master had woken up. Since then, Hualong has cherished dogs as if they were his kin.

The "Tomb for the Righteous Dog" (义犬冢) is a tomb made for dogs who died in order to save their owners. During the Three Kingdoms period, there was a man named Li Xinchun, and his family had a dog named "Heilong" (黑龙, Black Dragon). Li loved this dog very much, allowing it to go wherever he went and eating with it.

"One day, Li was drunk outside the city and fell asleep in the grass on the side of the road. It happened that Zheng Xia, the Governor (上太守), came out to hunt, and seeing that the grass in the field was long, sent someone to set the grass on fire in order to scare out the animals. The place where Li lay was just downwind. 
When Heilong saw the fire coming, he dragged Li's clothes in its teeth, but Li didn't move. There was a small stream near where Li was lying, only thirty or fifty steps away from him. Heilong ran into the stream and soaked his body with water, then ran back to where Li was lying, wetting him with the water from the dog's body. In consequence, Li survived the fire, but Heilong was so tired that he died beside his owner.
When Li woke up and found his hair wet and Heilong dead beside him, he very surprised by what had happened. He saw the traces of the fire, and then burst into tears. The Governor Zheng Xia heard of the news, felt very sorry for the dog and said: "A dog's repayment of kindness is greater than man's. Man does not know (true) kindness; how can he compare to a dog?" He asked people to prepare coffin clothes for Heilong's burial. Today, Jinan  has the Tomb of the Righteous Dog, which is more than ten Zhàng high."
This story was recorded in the Soushenji.

Other canids in Chinese mythology
Other members of the canidae family also figure in Chinese mythology, including wolves and foxes. The portrayal of these is usually quite different than in the case of dogs. 

Tales and literature on foxes is especially extensive, with foxes often having magical qualities, such as being able to shift back and forth to human shape, live for incredible life spans, and to grow supernumerary tails (nine being common).

See also
Cynocephaly
Dogs in ancient China
Mosuo

References

Works cited
Christie, Anthony (1968). Chinese Mythology. Feltham: Hamlyn Publishing. .
Eberhard, Wolfram (2003 [1986 (German version 1983)]), A Dictionary of Chinese Symbols: Hidden Symbols in Chinese Life and Thought. London, New York: Routledge. 
Yang, Lihui, et al. (2005). Handbook of Chinese Mythology. New York: Oxford University Press. 
Mair, Victor H. (October, 1998). "Canine Conundrums: Eurasian Dog Ancestor Myths in Historical and Ethnic Perspective", in Sino-Platonic Papers 87. New Haven:Yale. < Stable URL: www.sino-platonic.org/complete/spp087_dog_myths.pdf >
Sima Qian Records of the Historian: Chapters from the Shih Chi of Ssu-ma Ch'ien. Translated by Burton Watson (1969). New York: Columbia University Press. .
Yu, Anthony C., editor, translator, and introduction (1980 [1977]). The Journey to the West. Chicago and London: The University of Chicago Press. 

Animals in Chinese mythology
Mythological dogs